The  is a Grade 1 Ban'ei horse race, held in Obihiro, Hokkaido, Japan for four-year-olds and up.

The race is the championship race held in the end of the season (March) with the highest weight and prize money among all ban'ei races .

Winners since 2001 

Horse races in Japan